Charles J. Ferguson (April 17, 1863 – April 29, 1888) was an American right-handed pitcher in Major League Baseball who played his entire four-year career for the Philadelphia Quakers (who were later renamed the Phillies). When not pitching, he increasingly played in the outfield and – in his final season – at second base.

Career
Born in Charlottesville, Virginia, he played baseball for the University of Virginia in 1882, although he was never a student there. He also played for the Virginia representative in the Eastern League, with his team winning the championship. Philadelphia finished 6th in the National League that season, and Ferguson had a win/loss record of 21-25. That was the only season in which he produced a losing record, and he had his highest earned run average with 3.54.

On August 29, he pitched a no-hitter against the Providence Grays, a 1-0 victory.

He continued his dominance in the  season, winning 30 games and again lowering his ERA, this time to 1.98, good for second in the NL behind Henry Boyle of the St. Louis Maroons. In , he won 22 games and had a 3.00 ERA. That same season, he played 27 games at second base, and had 264 at bats. Along with his 22 victories, he led the team in runs batted in with 85, and his .337 batting average would have led his team as well had his total plate appearances been enough to qualify for the batting title.

Death
Before the  baseball season, he contracted typhoid fever and subsequently died in Philadelphia. He is interred in Maplewood Cemetery in his hometown of Charlottesville. For the 1888 season, the Quakers, Washington Nationals, New York Giants and Boston Beaneaters wore a black crepe on their left sleeves to commemorate Ferguson. In 1931, Wilbert Robinson rated Ferguson as the fifth-best player to that point in baseball history.

See also

List of baseball players who died during their careers
List of Major League Baseball annual saves leaders
List of Major League Baseball no-hitters

References

External links

1863 births
1888 deaths
Major League Baseball pitchers
19th-century baseball players
Philadelphia Quakers players
Baseball players from Virginia
Sportspeople from Charlottesville, Virginia
Deaths from typhoid fever
People born in the Confederate States